This Thing Called Love is a 1959 album by American singer Tommy Sands, arranged by Bob Bain.

Reception 

The initial Billboard magazine review from February 23, 1959 awarded the album four stars and commented that "Should I", "Don't Blame Me", "All Over Again", and "Sunday" "reveal a new side of the versatile young chanter" and that the "set can attract buys from adult and teen buyers".

Track listing 
 "You're Driving Me Crazy" (Walter Donaldson)
 "I Only Have Eyes For You" (Al Dubin, Harry Warren)
 "Don't Blame Me" (Jimmy McHugh, Dorothy Fields)
 "All I Do Is Dream of You" (Nacio Herb Brown, Arthur Freed)
 "All Over Again" (Tommy Edwards)
 "I'm Confessin'" (Al Neiburg, Doc Daugherty, Ellis Reynolds)
 "Should I?" (Brown, Freed)
 "I'm Yours" (Robert Mellin)
 "Sunday" (Chester Conn, Benny Krueger, Ned Miller, Jule Styne)
 "My Happiness" (Betty Peterson Blasco, Borney Bergantine)
 "That Old Feeling" (Sammy Fain, Lew Brown)
 "Afraid"

Personnel 
Tommy Sands – vocals
Bob Bain – arranger

References

External links 
 

1959 albums
Capitol Records albums
Tommy Sands (American singer) albums